Dasma is one of the areas of the Capital Governorate in Kuwait City, Kuwait. Its name, literally translated to "Rich", is in reference to its rich soil and greenish Spring.

Dasma is surrounded by Bneid Al-Gar from the East,  Mirgab from north, Mansouria from the West and Da'iya from the South.

References

Suburbs of Kuwait City